Lauren Ford (23 January 1891 - 30 August 1973) was an American painter and author. Ford's works were held at the Corcoran Gallery of Art and Museum of Modern Art. Outside of painting, her book The Ageless Story was named a Caldecott Medal Honor in 1940.

Early life and education
Ford was born on 23 January 1891 in New York City, New York. She went to school at the Art Students League of New York and Académie Colarossi in Paris, France. When Ford was one and a half years old, she was taught by her mother how to draw.

Career
Ford began her career in painting before writing. In 1928, her artwork was selected to be held at the Ferargil Galleries in New York. In the 1930s, her painting Choir Practice was shown at the Corcoran Gallery of Art in Washington, D.C. In 1937, Ford's painting The Country Doctor placed in second for the Popular Prize at the Annual Exhibition in Pittsburgh, Pennsylvania. Additional museums Ford's paintings were shown at include the Museum of Modern Art and the Art Institute of Chicago. Outside of painting, Ford was a writer and an illustrator. Ford wrote her first book in 1934 titled The Little Book About God with following books including Our Lady's Book in 1962 and Lauren Ford's Christmas Book in 1963. For illustrations, Ford illustrated for multiple authors including Clare Boothe Luce and Winston Churchill. Choir Practice is currently owned by the National Gallery of Art.

Awards and honors
Ford's book The Ageless Story was awarded with a Caldecott Medal Honor in 1940.

Personal life
At the time of her death, Ford had a daughter who she had adopted.

Death
Ford died on 30 August 1973 in Waterbury, Connecticut.

References

1891 births
1973 deaths
20th-century American painters
American women painters
20th-century American women writers
Painters from New York City
Writers from New York City
Art Students League of New York alumni
Académie Colarossi alumni
20th-century American women artists